Joseph Francis Judge (born December 31, 1981) is an American football coach who is an offensive assistant for the New England Patriots of the National Football League (NFL). Judge served as the head coach of the New York Giants from 2020 to 2021. Prior to joining the Giants, Judge served as an assistant coach for the Patriots from 2012 to 2019. The Patriots appeared in four Super Bowls, winning three of them, during Judge's tenure.

Early years
Judge was born in Philadelphia, Pennsylvania. Growing up in Doylestown, Pennsylvania, he graduated from Lansdale Catholic High School in Lansdale, Pennsylvania. Judge played for Mississippi State from 2000 to 2004, earning three letters. He was also named to the SEC Academic Honor Roll and made the Dean's List.

Coaching career

Assistant coach
In 2005, he joined his alma mater, Mississippi State University, as a graduate assistant for the Bulldogs. He next served briefly as the linebackers coach for the Birmingham–Southern Panthers in 2008 and then as a special teams assistant for Alabama. In 2012, he joined the New England Patriots as a special teams assistant and served in that role through the 2014 season. Following the Patriots' victory over the Seattle Seahawks in Super Bowl XLIX, Judge was promoted to special teams coordinator following the retirement of Scott O'Brien. On February 5, 2017, Judge was part of the Patriots' coaching staff that won Super Bowl LI. In the game, the Patriots defeated the Atlanta Falcons by a score of 34–28 in overtime.

On February 6, 2018, it was reported that Judge was leaving the Patriots to join the Indianapolis Colts' new head coach Josh McDaniels in Indianapolis; when McDaniels spurned the Colts and chose to stay with the Patriots, Judge made the same decision. After wide receivers coach Chad O'Shea left New England to become offensive coordinator for the Miami Dolphins, Judge was tapped to fill O'Shea's role while continuing to serve as special teams coordinator; according to ESPN, he was the only coach in the NFL with both special teams and wide receiver duties. Judge won his third Super Bowl title when the Patriots defeated the Los Angeles Rams in Super Bowl LIII.

New York Giants

On January 8, 2020, Judge was hired to become the 21st head coach of the New York Giants. According to Sports Illustrated's Rick Gosselin, he is only the second NFL head coach to have been hired directly from a special teams coaching job, after Frank Gansz.

2020 season

On September 13, 2020, Judge lost his head coaching debut against the Pittsburgh Steelers by a score of 26–16. After an 0–5 start to the season, Judge received his first career win as a head coach in a 20–19 win against the Washington Redskins on October 18, 2020. On November 18, 2020, there was a coaching controversy when Judge fired his offensive line coach Marc Colombo and replaced him with former Dolphins offensive line coach Dave DeGuglielmo after Week 10, due to a verbal altercation. In his first season as the head coach of the Giants, Judge led them to a 6–10 record, finishing second in the NFC East. At the end of the season he was criticized for comments he made about the Philadelphia Eagles not putting in effort, causing the Giants to miss the playoffs.

2021 season

The Giants regressed during Judge's second season, going 4–13 and finishing last in the NFC East. Judge recorded the most losses by a Giants head coach with 13 surpassing the mark of 12 by Jim Fassel in 2003. Judge was fired on January 11, 2022, finishing his tenure in New York with an overall record of 10–23 (.303). Judge's season suffered from questionable calls, such as a coach's challenge on a non-reviewable scoring play during Week 1 versus the Denver Broncos, a controversial post-game locker room rant after a loss to the Chicago Bears, and a quarterback sneak on 3rd and 9 against their own goalline during a Week 18 matchup against the Washington Football Team.

New England Patriots (second stint)
On February 8, 2022, the Patriots announced that Judge was hired as an offensive assistant. On July 21, 2022, the Patriots announced that he will also be the Quarterbacks coach. He lost his quarterback's coach job following the hire of Bill O'Brien on January 26, 2023.

Personal life
Judge's father, Joseph, played football at Temple and professionally with the Hamilton Tiger-Cats of the Canadian Football League. Judge's wife, Amber, was an All-SEC soccer player at Mississippi State, and they have four children together.

Head coaching record

References

External links
 New England Patriots bio

1981 births
Living people
New England Patriots coaches
New York Giants head coaches
Mississippi State Bulldogs football coaches
Mississippi State Bulldogs football players
Alabama Crimson Tide football coaches
Birmingham–Southern Panthers football coaches
Sportspeople from Philadelphia
Players of American football from Philadelphia